Lee Dong-gun (born 26 July 1980) is a South Korean actor and singer.

Career
Lee Dong-gun made his debut in the entertainment industry in 1998 as a singer, but he would later gain fame as an actor, starring in television dramas such as Sweet 18, Lovers in Paris, and Stained Glass.

Lee took a break from acting in 2005, claiming he felt overwhelmed with his workload in both television and film. He resumed his work in 2006, with Smile Again.

During a fan meeting event in Japan held on 5 December 2005, Lee announced the release of his first photobook which also included a making-of DVD, poster and postcard. The success of Lovers in Paris along with promotions for his new film My Boyfriend Is Type B helped to increase his popularity in Japan.

Lee participated in the Hallyu Expo in Asia on Jeju island which commenced on 28 November 2006 and spanned a total of 100 days. This large-scale event was intended to promote Korean culture across Asia and expected to bring in 150,000 tourists to stimulate the local economy. He also attended the sequel to the Hallyu Expo which was held in Japan titled FACE in Japan Premium Event. This two-day event from 14 to 15 August 2007, featured Korean celebrities with large fanbases and was intended as a cultural exchange program between Korea and Japan.

Lee released a 14-track album titled My Biography in 2008, his first full-length album in a decade. It included 6 Korean songs, 6 Japanese songs and 2 instrumentals. It was first released in Japan before becoming available in Korea. The same year, he starred in the television series  Night After Night alongside Kim Sun-ah, and starred alongside an ensemble cast in the romance film Love Now.

In December 2011, three months prior to the completion of his mandatory military service, Lee signed with talent agency Mask Entertainment. After the termination of his contract with Mask Entertainment, Lee signed with FNC Entertainment in November 2012.

In 2013, Lee was cast in the lead role for the time-travel romance Marry Him If You Dare. This was followed in 2015 by the titular role in cable series Super Daddy Yeol, which was based on the webtoon of the same name. In 2016, Lee starred in the family drama The Gentlemen of Wolgyesu Tailor Shop. He also starred in his first Chinese drama, Hello Mr. Right alongside actress Guan Xiaotong.

In the historical drama Queen for Seven Days, Lee impressed viewers with his a wide range of emotions and acting performance with his role as the tyrannical Joseon ruler Yeonsangun. He then starred in action drama Sketch, playing a member of a special operations command who seeks revenge for the death of his wife; and slice-of-life drama Where Stars Land.

In 2019, Lee was cast in the fantasy romance drama Angel's Last Mission: Love.

Personal life
On 20 March 2008, Lee's 19-year-old brother Lee Joon-yub, a student at the University of Sydney, was fatally stabbed during a brawl with two Chinese teenage gang members at Hungry Jack's in World Square, Sydney. The victim's friend, 22-year-old Song Jung-ho, was critically injured but survived. Lee flew to Sydney to identify his brother's body and attend a requiem mass at the Chapel of St. John's College; after cremation, his family brought back Lee Joon-yub's ashes to Seoul.

Military service 
Lee enlisted for his mandatory military service on 15 June 2010 at the 102 Reserves in Chuncheon, Gangwon Province for four weeks of basic training followed by 21 months of active duty. He served at the Defense Media Agency of the Ministry of National Defense and was appointed Honorary Ambassador of Military. He was discharged on 28 March 2012, and on the same day, he was appointed promotional ambassador for the 2012 Korean Formula One Grand Prix held at the Korea International Circuit in October.

Relationship and marriage 
On 28 February 2017, Lee Dong-gun was confirmed to be dating Jo Yoon-hee, his co-star in The Gentlemen of Wolgyesu Tailor Shop. On 2 May, Lee announced that they have registered their marriage and are expecting their first child. The couple held a private wedding ceremony on 29 September and welcomed a baby girl on 14 December 2017. On May 29, 2020, they divorced due to irreconcilable differences.

Discography

Albums

Singles
 "Salad Song" – Yoon Eun-hye feat. Lee Dong-gun

Filmography

Television series

Web series

Film

Music video
 Eun Hyul – "Tardy Love"
 Position – "A Day"
 Big Bang – "Last Farewell"
 Lee Hyori – "Don't Love Her"
 Yoon Eun-hye feat. Lee Dong-gun – "Salad Song"
 4Tomorrow – "Tomorrow"

Musical theatre
 1998: Wandering Stars (방황하는 별들)

Awards and nominations

References

External links
  
 
 
 

1980 births
K-pop singers
Living people
Male actors from Seoul
Singers from Seoul
South Korean male film actors
South Korean male television actors
South Korean Roman Catholics
FNC Entertainment artists
21st-century South Korean  male singers